Oscar "Nicko" Schirmer (22 March 1907 – 30 December 1941) was a Swedish football, ice hockey and bandy player, known for representing Hammarby IF in all three sports.

Athletic career

Football
In 1930, Schirmer made his debut for Hammarby IF in Division 2. Playing as a centre-back or midfielder, regularly captaining the side, Schirmer mostly competed in the Swedish second division throughout his career. He became known for his heading skills and endurance on the pitch. Schirmer played his last season in 1939–40, making five appearances for Hammarby in the highest domestic league Allsvenskan.

Hockey
He played hockey with Hammarby IF in 1932 and 1936. The club won the Swedish championship both seasons, but Schirmer did not feature in the finals and therefore missed out on winning the gold medals. He also played with Hammarby's B-team for several seasons.

Bandy
Schirmer also played bandy with Hammarby IF between 1930 and 1936.

References

1907 births
1941 deaths
Ice hockey people from Stockholm
Swedish ice hockey players
Swedish bandy players
Swedish footballers
Hammarby Hockey (1921–2008) players
Hammarby IF Bandy players
Hammarby Fotboll players
Allsvenskan players
Association football midfielders